An imperial court is the royal court of an empire.

Imperial Court may also refer to:
Imperial court (Holy Roman Empire)
Imperial Court in Kyoto, pre-Meiji period in Japan
Imperial Court System, a non-profit organization in North America
Imperial Courts, Los Angeles, public housing

See also
 List of empires